Barth Island an uninhabited island in the Qikiqtaaluk Region of Nunavut, Canada. It is located in Peel Sound, south of Somerset Island's Four Rivers Bay, and the equally small Otrick Island. Prince of Wales Island is to the west.

References

External links 
 Barth Island in the Atlas of Canada - Toporama; Natural Resources Canada

Uninhabited islands of Qikiqtaaluk Region